The Miracle of Castel di Sangro is an account by American writer Joe McGinniss of the first season Italian association football club Castel di Sangro Calcio spent in Serie B.

References

Association football books
American non-fiction books
1999 non-fiction books
1996–97 in Italian football